Erymanthos is a municipality in the Achaea regional unit, Western Greece region, Greece. The seat of the municipality is the town Chalandritsa. The municipality has an area of 582.139 km2. It was named after Mount Erymanthos.

Municipality
The municipality Erymanthos was formed at the 2011 local government reform by the merger of the following 4 former municipalities, that became municipal units:
Farres
Kalentzi
Leontio
Tritaia

References

External links

Municipalities of Western Greece
Populated places in Achaea